The women's 23.8 km individual time trial competition at the 2006 Asian Games was held on 5 December at the Al-Khor Road Course.

Schedule
All times are Arabia Standard Time (UTC+03:00)

Results 
Legend
DNS — Did not start

References

External links 
Results

Road Women ITT